Staunton Law School was a law school operated in Staunton, Virginia, from 1831 to 1839, and from 1839 to 1849.

An 1831 report of the intended opening of the school stated:

The law school was established at a time when a number of new law schools were experimenting with new methods in teaching students, and was able to engage in the same experimentation. Baldwin, who disliked the tendency of lawyers taking on apprentices for their labor, but failing to teach them the law, "announced that he would experiment with a new teaching method" by dividing the law school into Junior and Senior classes, with the Junior class being assigned elementary readings in the law, and the senior class receiving lectures. The law school was described as "a large and successful law school, attended by students from many States", with Baldwin's lectures "covering the whole body of common and statute law and equity".

In 1939, Baldwin's school closed due to "pressures of business and age" affecting Baldwin, and Judge Lucas P. Thompson quickly established a new school referred to by the same name. Thompson doubted the value of lectures, and preferred to assign the students reading, and then quiz them on their knowledge of the assigned materials. The school then operated until its closure in 1849 due to competition pressures.

Notable alumni of the school include United States District Judge John James Dyer and Arkansas Supreme Court Justice Christopher C. Scott.

References

Defunct law schools
1831 establishments in Virginia
1849 disestablishments in Virginia